“Never Ever Can We Be Brothers” is a Ukrainian nationalist poem written by a Ukrainian poet and former information security specialist Anastasia Dmitruk in response to the Russian occupation of Crimea in 2014.

A song based on the words of the poem was written and performed by Lithuanian musicians from Klaipeda about a month later.

References

External links
 НИКОГДА МЫ НЕ БУДЕМ БРАТЬЯМИ! The poem on the poetess's website

Annexation of Crimea by the Russian Federation
2014 poems
Russia–Ukraine relations